The 2002 Asian Junior Badminton Championships were held in Kuala Lumpur Badminton Stadium, Kuala Lumpur, Malaysia from 14–21 July.

Medalists

Medal table

References

External links 
 亚洲青年锦标赛 at www.chinabadminton.com
 Final Juara milik Malaysia at ww1.utusan.com.my
 亚青羽球赛，古健杰王顺福圆冠军梦 at www.bbeshop.com

Badminton Asia Junior Championships
Asian Junior Badminton Championships
Asian Junior Badminton Championships
International sports competitions hosted by Malaysia
2002 in youth sport